The 1982 Davis Cup (also known as the 1982 Davis Cup by NEC for sponsorship purposes) was the 71st edition of the Davis Cup, the most important tournament between national teams in men's tennis. 58 teams would enter the competition, 16 in the World Group, 22 in the Europe Zone, 10 in the Americas Zone, and 10 in the Eastern Zone. Tunisia made its first appearance in the tournament.

The United States defeated France in the final, held at the Palais des Sports in Grenoble, France, on 26–28 November, to win their 28th title overall.

World Group

Draw

Final
France vs. United States

Relegation play-offs

Date: 1–3 October

Americas Zone

  are promoted to the World Group in 1983.

Eastern Zone

  are promoted to the World Group in 1983.

Europe Zone

Zone A

  are promoted to the World Group in 1983.

Zone B

  are promoted to the World Group in 1983.

References
General

Specific

External links
Davis Cup Official Website

 
Davis Cups by year
Davis Cup
Davis Cup